Chen He (born 9 November 1985), also known as Michael Chen, is a Chinese actor.

Chen is noted for playing Zeng Xiaoxian in the romantic comedy television series IPartment, which enjoyed the highest ratings in China when it was broadcast. Chen ranked 69th on Forbes China Celebrity 100 list in 2015, 54th in 2017, and 100th in 2019.

Career
Chen was born on 9 November 1985 in Changle District, Fuzhou. He is the son of Hu Xiaoling, an actress. Chen's uncle is Chen Kaige, a noted Chinese director. Chen graduated from Shanghai Theatre Academy, majoring in acting.

In 2009, Chen starred in a romantic comedy television series IPartment; the series was one of the most watched ones in mainland China in that year. Chen also filmed in a number of successful sequels to IPartment.

In 2014, Chen took part in the Chinese remake of the Korean Running Man; this popularized him among television audiences once again.

Personal life
In September 2013, Chen married high school sweetheart Xu Jing in Phuket Island, Thailand, who was a graduate of University of Auckland.

In 2016, Chen married actress Zhang Zixuan. On 23 October, their daughter was born.

Filmography

Film

Television series

Variety show

Discography

References

External links
 Chen He on Sina Weibo

1985 births
Shanghai Theatre Academy alumni
Male actors from Fuzhou
Chinese male television actors
Living people
21st-century Chinese male actors
Chinese male film actors